The year 1776 in architecture involved some significant events.

Buildings and structures

Buildings

 The Landhaus (Dresden), designed by Friedrich August Krubsacius, is completed.
 City Hall, Weesp in the Netherlands, designed by Jacob Otten Husly with Leendert Viervant the Younger, is completed.
 Rauma Old Town Hall in Finland, designed by Christian Friedrich Schröder, is built.
 Hôtel du Châtelet town house in Paris, designed by Mathurin Cherpitel, is built.
 Château Malou near Brussels in the Austrian Netherlands is built.
 Curtea Nouă palace in Bucharest, Principality of Wallachia, is completed. 
 New Wardour Castle in Wiltshire, England, designed by James Paine, is built to replace the ruined Wardour Castle.
 Woolverstone Hall in Suffolk, England, designed by John Johnson, is built.
 The Wenyuan Chamber, an imperial library in the Forbidden City of Beijing, is built.
 The Palazzi di S. Apollinare in Rome is extended by Pietro Camporese il Vecchio and Pasquale Belli.
 The church of San Barnaba, Venice, is reconstructed by Lorenzo Boschetti.
 The Villa del Poggio Imperiale near Florence in Tuscany is remodelled by Gaspare Paoletti.
 11–15 Portman Square, London, designed by James Wyatt, are completed.
 The Dobbin House Tavern in Gettysburg, Pennsylvania, is built and is later used as a home on the Underground Railroad.
 New Aray Bridge on Inveraray Castle estate in Scotland, designed by Robert Mylne, is completed.

Births
 June 8 – Thomas Rickman, English architect and architectural antiquary (died 1841)
 June 11 – James Gillespie Graham, Scottish architect (died 1855)
 August 22 – Carlo Amati, Italian architect (died 1852)

Deaths
 June 4 – Johann Gottfried Rosenberg, German-Danish rococo architect (born 1709)

References

Architecture
Years in architecture
18th-century architecture